Brunel University London is a public research university located in the Uxbridge area of London, England. It was founded in 1966 and named after the  Victorian engineer and pioneer of the Industrial Revolution, Isambard Kingdom Brunel. In June 1966, Brunel College of Advanced Technology was awarded a royal charter and became Brunel University. The university is often described as a British plate glass university.

Brunel is organised into three colleges, a structure adopted in August 2014 which also changed the university's name to Brunel University London. Brunel's three constituent Academic Colleges include the College of Business, Arts and Social Sciences; the College of Engineering, Design and Physical Sciences; and the College of Health, Medicine and Life Sciences.

Brunel has over 16,150 students and 2,500 staff, and the annual income of the institution for 2021–22 was £271.3 million, of which £22.4 million was from research grants and contracts, with an expenditure of £311.9 million. The university is ranked as one of the top 400 universities in the world by QS World University Rankings 2022 and the Times Higher Education World University Rankings 2022. The university won the Queen's Anniversary Prize in 2011. Brunel is a member of the Association of Commonwealth Universities, the European University Association, and Universities UK.

History

Origins
Brunel is one of a number of British universities which were established in the 1960s following the Robbins Report on higher education. It is sometimes described as a "plate glass university". The university's origins lie in Acton Technical College, which was split into two in 1957: Acton Technical College continued to cater for technicians and craftsmen, and the new Brunel College of Technology (named after Isambard Kingdom Brunel, the British engineer) was dedicated to the education of chartered engineers.

The campus buildings were designed in the Brutalist style of architecture by Richard Sheppard, Robson & Partners, Architects.

In 1960 Brunel College of Technology was awarded the status of College of Advanced Technology, and it was decided that it should expand at another site in order to accommodate the extra buildings that would be needed. Uxbridge was chosen to house the new buildings, and construction work hadn't even begun before the Ministry of Education officially changed the college's status: it was officially named Brunel College of Advanced Technology in 1962 – the tenth Advanced Technology College in the country, and the last to be awarded this title.

The Uxbridge (Vine Street) railway branch line was closed in 1964, and the college purchased the land adjacent to its site where the railway had run for £65,000 from the local council.

1966 to present

A royal charter granting university status and the power to award degrees was awarded on 9 June 1966. 

The university continued to use both campuses until 1971, when it left the Acton site. In 1980, the university merged with Shoreditch College of Education (Shoreditch Training College), located at Cooper's Hill, Runnymede which became Brunel's second campus.

In 1995, the university expanded again, integrating the West London Institute of Higher Education, and adding campuses in Osterley and Twickenham, and increasing the number of courses that the university was able to offer. Traditionally the university's strengths were in engineering, science, and technology, but with the addition of the West London Institute, new departments such as arts, humanities, geography and earth science, health and sports science were added, and the size of the student body increased to over 12,000.

Brunel has been the subject of controversy as its approach to higher education has been both market-driven and politically conservative. The decision to award an honorary degree to Margaret Thatcher in 1996, following the University of Oxford's refusal to do so, provoked an outcry by staff and students, and as a result the ceremony had to be held in the House of Lords instead of on campus. In the late 1990s, the Departments of Physics, Chemistry, and Materials Engineering were all closed, and, in 2004, the then Vice-Chancellor Steven Schwartz, initiated the reorganisation of the university's faculties and departments into schools, and closed the Department of Geography and Earth Sciences. The succeeding Vice-Chancellor, the sociologist Christopher Jenks, took office in 2006. He was followed by Julia Buckingham, previously at Imperial College London, who took up the position of Vice-Chancellor at Brunel in 2012.

In 2014 the university underwent an internal reorganisation and the name was changed to Brunel University London by a supplemental charter dated 16 July 2014. In 2016 Brunel celebrated its 50th Anniversary since being awarded its royal charter, and staged a 14-month programme of more than 40 celebratory events.

In December 2020, the university's Chancellor Sir Richard Sykes lead an independent review of the Vaccine Taskforce (UK) strategy and goals, and in June 2021 he was subsequently appointed as the taskforce's new chair, leading work to find, procure and deliver vaccines and oversee preparations for vaccine booster programmes as part of UK's COVID-19 vaccination programme.

In April 2021 it was announced that Professor Julia Buckingham CBE would be stepping down as Vice-Chancellor and President after nearly 10 years in the role. She has been succeeded by Professor Andrew Jones, who took up the position in January 2022.

Campus

In the late 1990s Brunel devised a 10-year, £250 million masterplan for the campus. This involved selling off campus sites at Runnymede, Osterley and Twickenham and using the revenue from the sales to renovate and update the buildings and facilities on the Uxbridge campus. Works carried out included a library extension, a state-of-the-art sports complex, renovated students' union facilities, a new Health Sciences teaching centre, and the construction of more halls of residence.

The original Brunel campus was designed by Richard Sheppard, Robson and Partners, with many buildings retaining the 1960s 'Brutalist' architectural style. It has appeared in several films, most famously in Stanley Kubrick's A Clockwork Orange, large parts of which were filmed on campus, particularly in the John Crank Building (demolished July 2019) and the Grade II listed Lecture Centre. It has also featured in several UK television series including Spooks, Silent Witness, The Sweeney and Inspector Morse.

Organisation and governance

Colleges
Brunel has three constituent Academic Colleges:

College of Engineering, Design and Physical Sciences 

College of Business, Arts and Social Sciences 

College of Health, Medicine and Life Sciences

Research institutes
Research at Brunel has been organised into five institutes 
Institute of Communities and Society
Institute of Digital Futures
Institute of Energy Futures
Institute of Health, Medicine and Environments
Institute of Materials and Manufacturing

Governance
Brunel exists by virtue of a royal charter first granted in 1966 and it has the status of an exempt charity as defined by the Charities Act 2011.

The governing body of Brunel is the council, which comprises university staff and students and independent members. The Council appoints the Vice-Chancellor and other senior officers. The council has established a number of Committees which support its work.

The current Chancellor of the university is Sir Richard Sykes, a biochemist and former Rector of Imperial College London. The Vice-Chancellor since 2022 is Professor Andrew Jones, formerly Deputy President at City, University of London.

Brunel's academic governing body is the Senate, which is chaired by the Vice-Chancellor. The Senate's powers, duties and functions are set out in its Ordinances, and it has a number of Committees which support its work.

Finances
In the financial year ended 31 July 2020, Brunel had a total income (including share of joint ventures) of £237.1 million (2018–19 – £229.8 million) and total expenditure of £235.7 million (2018–19 – £224.7 million).

Total income for 2019–20 was £237.1 million, £7.3 million (3.2%) higher than in 2018–19. Tuition fees overall increased by £10.1 million, reflecting the increase in the number of students enrolled, while funding body grants were flat at £30.6 million. Research grant income for 2019/ 20 was £3.1 million higher than in 2018–19 on a recognised income basis. Research income reflects the timing of work undertaken on research grants, as income is recognised in the financial statements over a period typically averaging three years. Other income reduced by £6.0 million, or 12.4%. This consists of student residences income, conference, hotel, retail and also income from summer school activity for foreign language students on the campus. All categories were significantly impacted by the pandemic, including the decision by the university not to charge rent for accommodation for the final term.

Excluding the Universities Superannuation Scheme (USS) pension revaluation, expenditure was £9.8 million (4.3%) higher than in 2018–19. Excluding pension adjustments, staff costs of £135.0 million were £15.5 million (13.0%) higher than in 2018–19. The university invested resources in its academic provision as its tuition fee income and student numbers have increased and has also targeted staff cost investment in its information technology provision and other support services. Other operating expenses of £76.9 million were £5.6 million lower than in 2018–19.

Coat of arms
The Brunel Coat of Arms was granted to the university in 1966 and incorporates various images representative of the university's heritage and principles. For example, the masonry arch symbolises Isambard Kingdom Brunel, the compass and cogwheel symbolise technology, the ermine lozenge is an allusion to the Arms of Lord Halsbury, the first Chancellor of the university, and the crest of the swan symbolises Uxbridge.

Academics

Brunel students have access to specialist laboratories for electronic imaging, bioprocessing and experimental techniques; flight, driving and train simulators; a 3-D body scanner; an MRI scanner; motion-capture equipment; an occupational therapy suite; sports and performing arts facilities; and academic archives in cult film and contemporary writing.

Depending on the degree course followed, many undergraduate students may choose to undertake practical placements and projects as an integral part of their courses (a founding principle of the sandwich degree structure).

Research
In the 2008 Research Assessment Exercise (RAE), 90% of Brunel research submitted was rated as being of international quality. In the Research Excellence Framework (REF) in 2014 Brunel was ranked 33rd for Research Power.

A comparison of the data submitted to REF2021 compared to the submission for REF2014 demonstrates a 9.6% increase of staff Full-time equivalent (FTE) submitted, a 5.9% increase in Early Career Researchers, 22% increase in PhD graduation per staff (FTE) per year and a 55% increase in spend per staff (FTE) per year.

Courses at Brunel draw on staff's research in areas including Cancer Genetics, Environmental Science, Human-Centred Design, Materials Processing, Contemporary Music and Digital Performance, Children's Education and Sports Medicine.

Made in Brunel
Brunel's Department of Design holds a yearly design exhibition called Made In Brunel, to promote and showcase the work of final year students to the design industry. In past years it has been held at the Business Design Centre in Islington, and the Oxo Tower Wharf. From 2011 onwards the exhibition has been held at the Bargehouse, on the Southbank, London.

Rankings

Brunel performed well in the annual rankings of UK universities produced by The Guardian and The Times, in part due to its strong performance in the Teaching Quality Assessment (where Brunel received a score of 20/24 or better for every subject assessed). The Guardian and The Times ceased using the TQA to compile their rankings (they use the National Student Survey results instead) and therefore Brunel had fallen in both rankings. However, the university regained its league position in 2012 partly due to improved student satisfaction and spending on students. As a result, it was ranked 39th in the Sunday Times University Guide. In the 2013 Guardian University Guide, the university's national ranking rose to 44th. In the 2014–15 THES world university rankings, Brunel ranked 226–250 (shared), representing a sharp rise in rankings. Brunel was ranked as the 93rd best university worldwide in the field of engineering and technology, 32nd among European institutions and 11th among British institutions according to THES world rankings. In August 2014, Brunel re-entered the Academic Ranking of World Universities (ARWU) Shanghai Jiao Tong Rankings after a four-year absence at number 409 globally, and 34 in the UK. Also, in 2015 Brunel was ranked 25th in Times Higher Education's 100 under 50 ranking of the top 100 world universities under 50 years old. The university is ranked as one of the top 400 universities in the world by QS World University Rankings 2022 and the Times Higher Education World University Rankings 2022.

The university won the Queen's Anniversary Prize in 2011.

Student life

Student recreational and general facilities
Brunel has a gym, spa, and running track with professional training and medical facilities. On campus there is also a pharmacy, a shop, one bar called Locos, a nightclub called Venue, and a café named "1966" after the year of the university's founding. Historically Brunel Student Hall and The Sports Barn were key venues for band tours in the 1970-90's with some of the biggest names in rock music including, Fairport Convention, Fleetwood Mac, The Who, Deep Purple, Genesis, ELO, The Kinks, Thin Lizzy, Joy Division, The Pretenders, The Specials, The Stone Roses. The Sex Pistols played the first gig of their 'Never Mind the Bans Tour' at Brunel on 16 December 1977.

The Bannerman Centre at the heart of the campus contains a 4 floor library (opened in 1973 by Heinrich Böll) with c.400,000 books and 1,500 study spaces, usually open 24/7 during term-time. The Bannerman Annexe contains the Professional Development (Careers) Centre, PC labs, large teaching rooms with collaborative technology and various student service functions such as the Assistive Technology Centre.

Union of Brunel Students
The Union of Brunel Students is the students' union of Brunel University. The Union is based within the Hamilton Centre on the Uxbridge campus.

Among other services, the Union runs two venues on the Brunel campus: the Venue nightclub, Loco's bar.

The Union is led by fourteen democratically elected staff from the student body – six Student Officers, four Standing Committee Chairs and six Working Group Chairs – supported by over thirty professional staff.

The Brunel Times & Hillingdon Herald
The Brunel Times is Brunel University's official student newspaper. Before 2019, it was called Le Nurb, which has Brunel spelt backwards. Before that, it was a magazine called Route 66, named after the different campus locations Runneymede, Osterley, Uxbridge and Twickenham, not after a bus route which supposedly ran through Brunel's campus along Cleveland Road. The newspaper editorial team is made up of volunteer students and is funded by the Union of Brunel Students. Traditionally, the newspaper has held a left-wing bias and has published interviews with prominent political figures including Shadow Chancellor John McDonnell, a Brunel alum and MP for Hayes and Harlington.

Hillingdon Herald is a monthly newspaper, written and produced by students from Brunel University London, with a focus on the London Borough of Hillingdon and wider London. Launched in October 2021, the first issue included columns from Prime Minister Boris Johnson, MP for Uxbridge and South Ruislip; former Shadow Chancellor John McDonnell; and David Simmonds, MP for Ruislip, Northwood and Pinner.

Formula Student
Brunel was one of the first UK universities to enter the Formula Student engineering competition, an annual event in which universities from around the world compete in static and dynamic events using formula style racing cars designed and manufactured by students. Brunel's Formula Student teams have won prizes in the annual competition every year since they first entered in 1999.

The Brunel Racing team is composed of undergraduate and postgraduate students, each being allocated an area of the car to develop. Students on MEng Mechanical Engineering courses act as team leaders and manage BEng students throughout the year to ensure a successful completion of a new car each year. Brunel Racing were UK Class 1 Formula Student Champions in 2002, and were the leading UK team at Formula ATA 2005, the Italian Formula Student event. In 2006 Formula Student Event, Brunel Racing were also the highest finishing UK competitor using E85 (fuel composed of 85% ethanol and 15% petrol.)

Student housing
Brunel's £250 million campus redevelopment programme, completed in 2008, refurbished existing halls and the built the new Isambard Complex. There are now 34 self-catering halls of residence on-campus, with a total of 4,549 rooms, including studio flats for co-habiting couples. Rooms are available for undergraduates, postgraduates, students with disabilities and co habiting couples. All rooms have network access.

Many of the halls of residence around the Uxbridge campus are named after bridges that Isambard Kingdom Brunel either built or helped to design; other halls are named either after him, or after other notable engineers or scientists.  For example:
Clifton Hall (named for the Clifton Suspension Bridge)
Saltash Hall (named for the Royal Albert Bridge that crosses the River Tamar at Saltash)
Chepstow Hall (named for the bridge across the River Wye at Chepstow)
Fleming Hall (named for Sir Alexander Fleming)
Faraday Hall (named for Sir Michael Faraday)
Galbraith Hall (named for W R Galbraith, who designed the Kew Railway Bridge)
Mill Hall (named for John Stuart Mill)

There are also three accommodation complexes: the Bishop Complex (Bishop, Kilmorey, Lacy and St Margaret's Halls); the Lancaster Complex (Lancaster, Stockwell, Southwark, Borough Road, Maria Grey and Gordon Halls); and the Isambard Complex (North, Meadow, Michael Bevis, Concourse, Stephen Bragg, West, Maurice Kogan, David Neave, Central, East, Runnymede, George Shipp, Trevor Slater, Shoreditch, Syd Urry, South and Brian Winstanley Halls).

Notable academics
  Bernardine Evaristo: Professor of Creative Writing, joint winner of the Booker Prize 2019
 Will Self: Professor of Modern Thought
 Heinz Wolff: Emeritus professor at Brunel University London founded the Brunel Institute for Bioengineering in 1983
Fiona Templeton: Senior Lecturer in Drama
Benjamin Zephaniah: Professor of Creative Writing

Vice-Chancellors of Brunel University
 1966 to 1971: James Topping
 1971 to 1981: Stephen Bragg
 1981 to 1989: Richard Evelyn Donohue Bishop
 1990 to 2001: Michael Sterling
 2002 to 2006: Steven Schwartz
 2006 to 2012: Christopher Jenks
 2012 to 2021: Julia Buckingham
 2021 to present: Andrew Jones

Chancellors of Brunel University
 1966 to 1997: Tony Giffard, 3rd Earl of Halsbury
 1998 to 2012: John Wakeham, Baron Wakeham
 2013 to present: Sir Richard Sykes

Notable alumni

Media, entertainment and the arts

 Ray BLK, stage name for Rita Ekwere, (English), singer-songwriter  
 Laurence Rickard, actor, screenwriter and comedian 
 Shohreh Aghdashloo, (International Relations), actress  
 Nick Abbot, (Psychology), radio presenter
 Rotimi Alakija, DJ, record producer and recording artist
 Hajaz Akram, actor
 Mark Bagley, comic book artist
 Carl Barât, ('Drama'), musician, The Libertines and Dirty Pretty Things
 Adam Benzine, (Multimedia Technology & Design), Oscar-nominated filmmaker and journalist
 Jo Brand, (Social Sciences and Nursing), comedian
 Dave Brown, photographer, graphic designer The Mighty Boosh
 Hopewell Chin'ono, filmmaker and journalist
 Marko Ciciliani, composer and audiovisual artist
 Michael Dapaah (Drama), actor, writer and comedian
 Greg Davies, (English and Drama), actor and comedian
 Francis French, space historian
 Alizeh Imtiaz, (English and Film and TV Studies BA 2008), director and actor
 Tony James, (Mathematics & Computer Science 1974), musician 
 Bryony Kimmings, performance artist 
 John Watts, musician, Fischer-Z
 Lee Mack, comedian
 Sophie McShera, (Drama), actress
 Oreke Mosheshe, (Management and Law), actor, television presenter and model
 Archie Panjabi, (Management Studies 1996), actor
 Nathaniel Peat, (Mechanical Engineering, Advanced Manufacturing Systems), social entrepreneur, winner of the reality TV show The Last Millionaire
 Claire Phillips, (Mechanical Engineering 1986), portrait artist
 Amber Rose Revah (Contemporary Performance), actress, House of Saddam and The Punisher
 Bindya Solanki, (Drama), actor
 Beverly Naya, Nigerian actress, stars in Tinsel
 Lucy Verasamy, (Geography), weather forecaster
 Kaan Yıldırım, (Marketing), Turkish Actor
 Damson Idris, (Actor), British Actor

Politics, nobility, and royalty

 Joyce Anne Anelay, Baroness Anelay of St John's, politician, Minister of State of the Foreign and Commonwealth Office
 Guillaume, Hereditary Grand Duke of Luxembourg, royalty
 Tengku Sarafudin Badlishah, Current Crown Prince of Kedah, one of the Crown Princes of Malaysia, as a federal constitutional monarchy
 John Leech (History and Politics), politician, MP for Manchester Withington
 John McDonnell, politician, former Shadow Chancellor of the Exchequer
 Ralph Miliband, political theorist
 James Colthurst, radiologist, son of the 10th Colthurst baronet, friend of Diana, Princess of Wales
 Ville Skinnari, (LLM), Finnish politician, Minister for Development Cooperation and Foreign Trade
 Reza Moridi, (MTech and PhD in physics), Canadian politician
 Hamdullah Mohib, (PhD Computer Systems Engineering), Afghan politician and diplomat, Ambassador of Afghanistan to the United States
 Anastasios Papaligouras (Master's in Comparative European Law), Greek politician, former Minister of Justice 
 Pantelis Kapsis (Master's in Economics), Greek politician & Journalist, former Minister of State 
 Pekka Sauri (PhD 1990), Finnish psychologist, politician, writer and cartoonist
 Seng Han Thong (MBA 1993), Singaporean politician
 Sarah Dines (Law), Conservative Party politician, MP For Derbyshire Dales
 Rosena Allin-Khan (Medical Biochemistry ), Labour Party politician, MP For Tooting
 Diana Johnson (Law), Labour Party politician, MP For Kingston upon Hull North
 Jenny Chapman (Psychology), Labour Party politician, MP For Darlington
 Rudi Vis (PhD Economics), Labour Party politician, MP For Finchley and Golders Green
 Alec Shelbrooke (Mechanical Engineering), Conservative Party politician, MP For Elmet and Rothwell
 John Tomlinson (Health Services Management), Labour politician and life peer
 Shailesh Vara (Law), Conservative Party politician, Secretary of State for Northern Ireland, MP for North West Cambridgeshire
 Claire Ward (MA Britain and the European Union), Labour politician, former MP for Watford
 Marina Yannakoudakis (BSc Government, Politics and Modern History), Conservative Party politician, MEP for London
 Abang Johari Openg, 6th Chief Minister of the State of Sarawak, Malaysia
 Gagan Sikand, Member of Parliament for Mississauga—Streetsville Constituency in Canada

Sports

 Tony Adams (Sports Science), footballer, former Arsenal and England captain and Portsmouth F.C. manager
 Eniola Aluko (Law), England Ladies footballer
 Ross Brawn, team principal for Mercedes Formula One team
 Mike Coughlan (Mechanical Engineering 1981), former Chief Designer for McLaren Formula One team
 James Cracknell (MSc Sport Science 1999), rower, Olympic gold medallist
 Abi Ekoku, former GB Lions rugby league manager, British discus champion and Bradford Bulls, London Broncos and Halifax winger
 Ben Gollings, rugby player, Captain of England Sevens, IRB Sevens Series all-time top scorer
 Chad Gould – Footballer
 Elizabeth Hall (Physiotherapy), athlete
 Roger Hammond (Materials Science), cyclist
 Audley Harrison (Sport Sciences 1999), boxer, Olympic gold medallist
 Richard Hill (Geography and Sports Science), rugby player, 2003 Rugby World Cup winner
 Ali Ibrahim, Egyptian rower
 Catherine Murphy, athlete
 Beth Rodford (Sport Science), rower
 Michael Olowokandi, former NBA player, No.1 overall pick of the 1998 NBA draft
 Abiodun Oyepitan (Politics and Sociology), athlete
 Perri Shakes-Drayton (Sport Sciences 2011), athlete
 Tom Shanklin, rugby player, Lions tourist and Wales rugby union international
 Iwan Thomas, (Geography and Sports Science), athlete
 Chad Gould, (Sports Science), footballer
 Heather Fell, (Physiotherapy), Olympic Modern Pentathlete and Triathlete

See also
 Armorial of UK universities
 College of advanced technology (United Kingdom)
 List of universities in the United Kingdom
 Universities in London

References

External links

 
Educational institutions established in 1966
1966 establishments in England
Buildings and structures in the London Borough of Hillingdon
Uxbridge
Universities in London
Universities UK
Isambard Kingdom Brunel